Lasia purpurata, the purple small-headed fly, is a species of small-headed flies in the family Acroceridae. It was first described by Joseph Charles Bequaert in 1933, from a single specimen collected from Oklahoma. It is now known to occur in Arkansas and Texas as well.

References

Acroceridae
Articles created by Qbugbot
Insects described in 1933
Taxa named by Joseph Charles Bequaert
Diptera of North America
Insects of the United States